Gérard Weber (1948 – 2016) was a French politician. Born in French Algeria, he became a kinesiotherapist. He served as a member of the National Assembly from 2002 to 2007, representing Ardèche's 2nd constituency. He also served as the mayor of Annonay from 2001 to 2008.

References

1948 births
2016 deaths
People from Chlef
People from Annonay
Mayors of places in Auvergne-Rhône-Alpes
Deputies of the 12th National Assembly of the French Fifth Republic